Highway 96 (AR 96, Ark. 96, and Hwy. 96) is a designation for two east–west state highways in the Arkansas River Valley. One route of  begins at Highway 10 in Greenwood and runs north and east to Highway 23 south of Ozark. Both routes are maintained by the Arkansas State Highway and Transportation Department (AHTD).



Route description
The southern portion of AR 96 begins at the Oklahoma state line west of Hartford.  It runs through Hartford and east to Mansfield, where it ends at U.S. Route 71.

AR 96 begins at AR 10 in Greenwood. The route runs north through Fort Chaffee and crosses AR 22 and AR 255. It continues north then east to cross AR 41 and eventually terminate at AR 23 in Franklin County.

History

Highway 96 was created during the 1926 Arkansas state highway numbering as a connector route between State Road 10 in Greenwood and State Road 22 west of Charleston.

The segment in Ozark was known as Highway 309 until September 25, 1991, when the route was redesignated as Highway 96 due to confusion with another nearby segment of Highway 309.

Major intersections

See also

 List of state highways in Arkansas

References

External links

096
Transportation in Franklin County, Arkansas
Transportation in Sebastian County, Arkansas